Tantramar may refer to:

 The Tantramar Marshes are former salt-marshes that were dyked and drained on the Isthmus of Chignecto between the Canadian provinces of New Brunswick and Nova Scotia
 Tantramar Regional High School is a secondary school serving the people of the Sackville-area in New Brunswick
 Tantramar (electoral district) is a riding which elects members to the Legislative Assembly of New Brunswick
 Tantramar Heritage Trust, a charity dedicated to preserving the heritage resources of this region
 Tantramar Civic Centre, an ice hockey arena in Sackville, New Brunswick, Canada